& Pictures is a Hindi satellite movie channel in India based in Mumbai. The channel is owned by Zee Entertainment Enterprises. It is the first channel of Zee Entertainment Enterprises under the new brand &. The channel primarily airs Bollywood and some Hollywood (in Hindi dubbed) films.

See also
Zee Cinema
Star Gold
Colors Cineplex

References

External links 
 Official Website

Satellite television
Zee Entertainment Enterprises
Television stations in Mumbai
Movie channels in India
Television channels and stations established in 1995